The Former Residence of Jia Yi or Jia Yi's Former Residence was built during the Qing dynasty (1644–1911). It is located in Tianxin District of Changsha, Hunan, China. It contains buildings such as the gate, the Grand Preceptor Hall, the Grand Preceptor Temple, the Xunqiu Cottage, the Old Tablet Pavilion, the Stone Tablets, the Grand Preceptor Well.

History
In 177, Jia Yi had retreated and worked in Hunan for the Changsha King's Grand Preceptor (he lived in here.

In 1580, in the eighth year of the age of the Wanli Emperor, the building was rebuilt by a local officer. It was renamed Qu Yuan and Jia Yi Temple.

In 1938, the Wenxi Fire damaged about ninety percent of the buildings; only the Grand Preceptor Hall survived.

In November 1996, the People's Government of Changsha rebuilt the residence.

On 10 October 1983, it was listed as a provincial culture and relics site.

It was open to outsiders on September 29, 1999.

Gallery

References

External links

Buildings and structures in Changsha
Traditional folk houses in Hunan
Tourist attractions in Changsha